Rosemergy is a hamlet near Morvah in Cornwall, United Kingdom on the B3306 road between St Ives and St Just.

References

Hamlets in Cornwall